Nancy Skinner may refer to:

Nancy Skinner (California politician) (born 1954), California State Senator
Nancy Skinner (commentator), radio host and political commentator
Nancy Skinner Nordhoff